Saint Joseph's College or Saint Joseph College may refer to:

Africa
 St Joseph's College, Kgale, Botswana
 St. Joseph's College, Sasse, Cameroon
 St Joseph's College, Curepipe, Mauritius
 St Joseph's Marist College, Rondebosch, South Africa

Asia

Lebanon
 Collège Saint Joseph – Antoura, Lebanon

Hong Kong
 St Joseph's College, Hong Kong

India
 St Joseph's College, Allahabad, India
 St Joseph's College, Bangalore, India
 St Joseph's College of Commerce, Bangalore, India
 St Joseph's College of Law, Bangalore, India
 St Joseph's College, Calcutta, India
 St. Joseph's College of Engineering, Chennai
 St Joseph's College, Darjeeling, India
 St Joseph Engineering College, Vamanjoor, Mangalore, India
 St. Joseph's College, Jakhama, Nagaland
 St Joseph's College, Moolamattom, India
 St Joseph's College, Nainital, India
 St Joseph's College, Tiruchirappalli, India

Indonesia
 Saint Joseph College, Malang, East Java, Indonesia

Japan
 Saint Joseph College, Yokohama, Japan

Pakistan
 St Joseph's College, Karachi, Pakistan

Philippines
 St Joseph's College of Balanga, Balanga City, Philippines
 St Joseph College of Cavite, Cavite City, Philippines
 Saint Joseph College of Maasin, Maasin City, Philippines
 St. Joseph College–Olongapo, Inc., Olongapo City, Philippines
 Saint Joseph's College of Quezon City, Quezon City, Philippines

Sri Lanka
 St Joseph's College, Bandarawela, Sri Lanka
 Saint Joseph's College, Colombo, Sri Lanka
 St Joseph's College, Trincomalee, Sri Lanka

Australia
 St Joseph's College, Echuca, Victoria
 St Joseph's College, Ferntree Gully, Victoria
 St Joseph's College, Geelong, Victoria
 St Joseph's College, Gregory Terrace, Brisbane, Queensland
 St Joseph's College, Hunters Hill, Sydney
 St Joseph's College, Melbourne (North Melbourne / Pascoe Vale), Victoria
 St Joseph's College, Nudgee, Brisbane, Queensland
 St Joseph's College, Toowoomba, Queensland
 Saint Joseph's College, Tweed Heads, New South Wales
 St Joseph's Catholic College, East Gosford, New South Wales
 St Joseph's College, Mildura, Victoria
 St Joseph's Primary, Queens Park, Western Australia
 St Joseph's Technical College, a former name of St Joseph's Technical School, Abbotsford, Victoria

Europe

Ireland
 Garbally College, Ireland (formerly known as St Joseph's College, Garbally)
 St Joseph's Patrician College in Galway

United Kingdom
 St Joseph's College, Blackpool, now a part of St Mary's Catholic Academy
 St Joseph's College, Coalisland, County Tyrone, Northern Ireland
 St Joseph's College, Dumfries, Scotland
 St Joseph's Catholic College, Bradford, England
 St Joseph's College, Ipswich, England
 St Joseph's College, Reading, England
 St Joseph's College, Stoke-on-Trent, England
 St Joseph's College, Upholland, a former seminary of the Archdiocese of Liverpool, England
 St Joseph's College, Upper Norwood, England

North America

Canada
 St. Joseph's College, Edmonton
 University of St. Joseph's College, now part of the University of Moncton, New Brunswick
 St. Joseph's College School, an all-girls' high school in Toronto
 Some sources give St. Joseph's College (or Collège Saint-Joseph) as the initial name of the University of Ottawa.

United States
 St. Joseph's College (Mountain View, California)
 University of Saint Joseph (West Hartford, Connecticut)
 Saint Joseph's College (Rensselaer, Indiana)
 St. Joseph's College (Bardstown, Kentucky), former college which is now home to the Oscar Getz Museum of Whiskey History and the Bardstown Historical Museum
 St. Joseph's College (Iowa), a former name of Loras College
 Saint Joseph's College (Standish, Maine) 
 St. Joseph's College (Emmitsburg, Maryland), former college which is now home to the National Emergency Training Center and Emergency Management Institute
 St. Joseph's University (Brooklyn/Patchogue, New York)
 Saint Joseph's University (Merion Station, Pennsylvania), known as Saint Joseph's College prior to 1978
 College of St. Joseph (Rutland, Vermont)
 College of St. Joseph on the Rio Grande (Albuquerque, New Mexico), later renamed University of Albuquerque

See also
 Saint Joseph's (disambiguation)
 St. Joseph's School (disambiguation)
 St. Joseph Seminary (disambiguation)
 Saint Joseph Academy (disambiguation)